Emmett S. Davis (February 28, 1886 – December 22, 1967) was an American sailor who competed in the 1932 Summer Olympics.

He was born in Maryland and died in Los Angeles, California.

In 1932 he was a crew member of the American boat Gallant which won the silver medal in the 6 metre class.

External links
 
 

1886 births
1967 deaths
American male sailors (sport)
Sailors at the 1932 Summer Olympics – 6 Metre
Olympic silver medalists for the United States in sailing
Medalists at the 1932 Summer Olympics